This article details the qualifying phase for taekwondo at the 2016 Summer Olympics. The competition at these Games comprised a total of 128 taekwondo fighters coming from their respective NOCs. Each NOC was allowed to enter up to a maximum of eight competitors, four of each gender, based on the WTF Olympic rankings, such that an athlete per NOC must be among the top six in each weight category. 

Four places had been reserved to the host nation Brazil, and another four had been invited by the Tripartite Commission. The remaining 120 places were allocated through a qualification process in which athletes had won quota place for their respective NOC.

Timeline

Qualification summary

Men's events

−58 kg

−68 kg

−80 kg

+80 kg

Women's events

−49 kg

−57 kg

−67 kg

+67 kg

References

Taekwondo qualification for the 2016 Summer Olympics
Olympic Qualification
Olympic Qualification
Taekwondo at the 2016 Summer Olympics
2016